Dan Erickson (born January 26, 1984) is an American television screenwriter, showrunner, and producer. He created, wrote and executive produced the psychological thriller television series Severance, starring Adam Scott and Britt Lower and directed by Ben Stiller and Aoife McArdle, which premiered on the Apple TV+ streaming service in February 2022.

Life and career 
Erickson is from Olympia, Washington. His parents are Mark and Lynn Erickson, a lawyer and a teacher respectively. He is a middle child, with an older brother named Matt and a younger sister named Hayley. Erickson has stated that he is very close with both siblings, and that they inspired characters on Severance.

He has written for Spike TV's Lip Sync Battle Pre-Show and worked in series development for now-defunct entertainment company Super Deluxe.

In 2016, Erickson's pilot script for Severance was recognized by The Bloodlist. He later submitted the script as a writing sample to Ben Stiller’s Red Hour Productions, and Stiller decided to produce the project. In 2019, Apple TV+ picked up the project for a straight-to-series order with Endeavor Content will served as co-financer and producer. Severance premiered on February 18, 2022 on Apple's streaming service to significant critical acclaim.

In September 2022, Erickson was named to the TIME100 Next list, which features "100 emerging leaders from around the world who are shaping the future and defining the next generation of leadership."

Filmography

Awards and honors

Hollywood Critics Association TV Awards

Primetime Emmy Awards

References 

Living people
American male television writers
People from Olympia, Washington
21st-century American screenwriters
Screenwriters from Oregon
1984 births